Wabag District is a district of the Enga Province of Papua New Guinea.  Its capital is Wabag.  The population of the district was 73,649 at the 2011 census.

References

Districts of Papua New Guinea
Enga Province